There are, in essence, three kinds of Cloud printing.

Benefits 
Consumers can print easily to any printer from their PC, tablet or smartphone, while the Cloud print service monitors the supplies level. Many printer vendors such as Lexmark  propose an automatic supplies shipment based on the real-time analysis of the printer supplies and user behavior to ensure printing will always be possible.

For IT department, Cloud Printing eliminates the need for print servers and represents the only way to print from Cloud virtual desktops and servers. For consumers, cloud ready printers eliminate the need for PC connections and print drivers, enabling them to print from mobile devices. As for publishers and content owners, cloud printing allows them to "avoid the cost and complexity of buying and managing the underlying hardware, software and processes"  required for the production of professional print products.

Leveraging cloud print for print on demand also allows businesses to cut down on the costs associated with mass production. Moreover, cloud printing can be considered more eco-friendly, as it significantly reduces the amount of paper used and lowers carbon emissions from transportation.

As many companies move their IT to the Cloud, some adopting the Windows 365 and Azure Virtual Desktop services from Microsoft, the connection from the Cloud environment to the on-premise printers become an issue as opening ports for incoming print flow traffic is not an option. In 2020, at the exact same time Google discontinued its Google Print offer, Microsoft has announced its Universal Print service offer, aimed at making printing compatible with Cloud Desktop environments, making printing driver-free and simple with no client to install on PC. With Universal Print Microsoft has built a disrupting architecture with a value proposition commodifying printers, removing print servers and drivers, allowing to move printers to VLAN for security purpose and printing from anywhere. Clients are free to use any printer from any model as they all work the same, clients are not tied anymore to any printer brand and that gave a significant boost to the Cloud print market.
That Microsoft Universal Print architecture provides APIs to third-party developers who can develop add-ons such as Celiveo 365  to extend Microsoft Cloud Print with added features such as access control on printers and copiers, follow-me pull print, data encryption, advanced usage reporting or charge back.

Providers of Consumer Cloud Printing Solutions 
Before 2020 only a handful of providers used to work towards a professional cloud print solution, operating in their own niche or focus on mobile devices.
In 2020 Microsoft has boosted that market by announcing its Universal Print Cloud printing service and since then many publishers start to propose solutions for that growing market.
The Covid pandemic also created the need for employees to be able to print at home when using the corporate IT software. Closed VPN often prevent accessing home network printers from corporate laptops and Full Public Cloud solutions are meant to be a solution to that problem.

After the decision by Google to terminate Google Cloud Print service the 31st of December 2020, most printer vendors released their own mobile cloud solution to fill the gap, while Hewlett-Packard implemented its own cloud print with their ePrint solution. Those solutions are often proprietary, only working on printers proposed by the vendor. Google has decided to let third-party developers develop Cloud Print solutions and to limit its scope to certifying the best Print Management offers compatible with its Chrome Enterprise Cloud ecosystem.

Providers of Corporate Cloud Printing solutions 
While many print solutions claim to be "Cloud Printing", there are actually three categories: full Private Cloud, full Public Cloud, and Hybrid Cloud. 
Their differences are real and have an impact on the overall TCO as the more software there is on-site, the more hidden cost there are. 

In the Full Public Cloud category, independent SaaS vendors like Celiveo, ezeep  and Printix  support a wide range of printer brands and models, allowing clients to buy the best printer without being locked on any brand. They are leveraging cloud computing technology to offer cloud-based print infrastructure and cloud-based printing software as a Service (SaaS). These solutions have integrations to cloud enabled printers or provide embedded printer agents. They feature allow users to print to any printer in any network, isolated network or not, even if that printer is otherwise not reachable from the user's computer. This also allows IT departments to move printers to VLAN for maximum security, like what they are doing with IP phones.

Google Chrome Enterprise Cloud ecosystem has its own technical particularities and Google certifies Print Management solutions, ensuring they comply with Google technical requirement, yet letting each solution differentiate from others with specific features or security. Many of solutions for Chrome Enterprise are Hybrid, a few are Full Public Cloud.

Industry experts believe that as these services become more popular, users will no longer consider printers as necessary assets but rather as devices that they can access on demand when the need to generate a printed page presents itself.

Caveats of Cloud Printing

Security 
Print jobs flow through Public Internet. It is therefore important to verify no Man-in-the-Middle attack can be performed. The only technical solution is to ensure each printer and PC uses a non-self-generated cryptographic token or certificate allowing TLS mutual authentication and specific data encryption. 
Self-generated printer certificates are unknown from the Cloud and prevent trusted authentication. Microsoft has implemented its Zero Trust Access security in its Universal Print service, it generates a unique certificate on printers compatible with its service. Other Cloud Printing SaaS providers have followed Microsoft on that High Security path.

Print jobs data stored on the Cloud is sensitive as it contains user information as well as all information appearing on pages. 
Good practices require such data is encrypted at rest and in motion, using asymmetric PKI keys instead of fixed encryption keys.

Some solutions require to open incoming traffic ports on the firewall to let Cloud services communicate with printers attached behind that firewall (most of the time for IPP/IPPS flows), some other solutions use a pull model where the communication is always initiated by the printer and no firewall port needs to be open. In term is security the later is to be preferred.

References

Cloud computing